Tjerk Bottema (4 March 1882 – 1940) was a Dutch painter. At age 14 he was sent Rijkskweekschool in Maastricht where he studied drawing. Later Bottema studies are the Rijksakademie van Beeldende Kunsten, where art-nouveau had just come to hold sway. During this time Bottema also started drawing advertisements, an activity that would later make him famous. In 1909 he has his first major success with the painting “Maaiers”, one year later he wins the prestigious Prix de Rome. During World War I he visited the Western Front to make an illustrated report for De Amsterdammer. After the war he settles in Paris, he finds a job writing travel reports for De Notenkraker. When in 1940 the German army approaches Paris Bottema decides to leave France, dying when the ship he was travelling on was traveling on was sunk by a German U-boat.

References 

1882 births
1940 deaths
20th-century Dutch artists
Dutch war correspondents
War correspondents of World War I
Dutch civilians killed in World War II